Tadić is a Croatian and Serbian surname, a patronymic and diminutive of the masculine given name Tadija. It may refer to:

 Boris Tadić (born 1958), Serb politician, former President of Serbia
 Duško Tadić (born 1955), a Bosnian Serb politician and the first individual to be tried by the International Criminal Tribunal for the former Yugoslavia
 Dušan Tadić (born 1988), Serbian footballer
 Josip Tadić (born 1987), Croatian football player
 Ljuba Tadić (1929–2005),  Serbian actor
 Ljubomir Tadić (1925–2013), Serbian philosopher
 Marko Tadić  (born 1953), Croatian mathematician
 Miroslav Tadić (musician), Serbian guitarist
 Milka Tadić, Montenegrin activist and magazine editor
 Ognjen Tadić (born 1974), Serb politician, former chairman of the House of Peoples of Bosnia and Herzegovina
 Željko Tadić (born 1974), Montenegrin footballer
 Vladan Tadić Rus (b. 1984), Serbian-Transnistrian fighter
 Vuk Tadic (b. 1955) Window Tinter in Chicago, owns East Side Window Tinting 



Anthropology

Tadić brotherhood in Piva

In Piva, a historical tribe of Old Herzegovina (now western Montenegro), there was a brotherhood (bratstvo) named Tadić. This brotherhood was one of the largest and oldest brotherhoods of Piva.  recorded 45 houses of Tadić in Piva. They have for long lived in Smriječno (in Plužine), where they are mainly concentrated, while one or two houses exist in Potprisoje, Donja Brezna and Stabna, which they settled later. The brotherhood has the slava (patron saint veneration) of Jovanjdan (John the Baptist). It belongs to the family tree of the old brotherhood of Branilović, one of two family trees in Piva from which many Pivan families descend from according to tradition; the Branilović either left or was absorbed by other families. A knez Jovan Tadić is mentioned in a 1673 document from the Piva Monastery, as one of the witnesses regarding the bequest of Bare on Jezerce to the monastery. According to one story, 17th-century hajduk Bajo Pivljanin's mother was a Tadić. Families descending from the brotherhood are widespread in former Yugoslavia. Former President of Serbia, Boris Tadić, is a descendant of the brotherhood.

References

Sources

Further reading

External links

Serbian surnames
Serbian families
Serb families